The 1908 Norwegian Football Cup was the seventh season of the Norwegian annual knockout football tournament. The tournament was open for 1908 local association leagues (kretsserier) champions, except in Smaalene and Kristiania og omegn, where a separate cup qualifying tournament was held. Lyn won their first title.

First round

|colspan="3" style="background-color:#97DEFF"|5 September 1908

|}

Odd, Kvik (Fredrikshald), Ørn received a bye.

Semi-finals

|colspan="3" style="background-color:#97DEFF"|12 September 1908

|}

Final

References

External links
RSSSF Football Archive

Norwegian Football Cup seasons
Norway
Football Cup